John Swift may refer to:

 John Swift (barrister) (born 1940), English barrister and Queen's Counsel
 John Swift (cricketer) (1852–1926), Australian first-class cricketer and Test match umpire
 John Swift (footballer, born 1984), English footballer for Bradford City
 John Swift (footballer, born 1995), English footballer for West Bromwich Albion
 John Swift (general) (1761–1814), American military officer
 John Swift (politician) (1790–1873), American lawyer and politician
 John Swift (trade unionist) (1896–1990), Irish trade union leader
 John E. Swift (1879–1967), American judge and the ninth Supreme Knight of the Knights of Columbus
 John Franklin Swift (1829–1891), Republican member of the California State Assembly in the 19th century
 John H. Swift (1840–1911), Irish-American manufacturer and politician
 John Swift, a party in Swift v. Tyson, 41 U.S. (16 Pet.) 1 (1842)

See also
 Jonathan Swift (1667–1745), Anglo-Irish writer